The Mumbai Police (Marathi: मुंबई पोलीस, IAST: Mumbaī Pulīs, formerly Bombay Police) is the police department of the city of Mumbai, Maharashtra. It is a part of Maharashtra Police and has the primary responsibilities of law enforcement and investigation within the limits of Mumbai.  The force's motto is "" (English: "To protect Good and to destroy Evil").

It is headed by the Commissioner of the Mumbai Police assisted by an IPS officer in the rank of Additional Director General, and each district headed is headed by a Deputy Commissioner of Police in the rank of Superintendent of Police (excluding jails headed by Inspector Generals). Each police station is headed by a Senior Inspector called the Station House Officer (SHO).

History

Early history 

From 1534 until 1661, Mumbai (then known as Bombay) was under Portuguese colonial rule. The Portuguese authorities in Mumbai established a police station in 1661, the same year it was transferred to the English colonial empire. Now being governed by the East India Company, the new city administration established a militia known as the Bhandari Militia (which consisted of approximately 600 Bandareen men supplied by 100 local landowners) in 1669 to combat street gangs that targeted sailors. This new force, which was organised by governor of Bombay Gerald Aungier, was headquartered at Mahim, Sevree and Sion (with a subedar stationed in each headquarter) and used primarily for law enforcement purposes. In 1672, the city administration implemented a policy of having all law enforcement decisions to be subject to judicial review by the judiciary, though the East India Company suffered from a lack of trained judges during the first decades of their control over Mumbai. The situation remained unchanged for decades. By 1682, law enforcement in Mumbai remained stagnant, and there was only one ensign, two corporals and three sergeants in the Bhandari Militia.

Creation and early days 
On 29 March 1780, the office of the Lieutenant of Police was dissolved and the office of Deputy of Police was created. James Tod, the then Lieutenant of Police was appointed as the first Deputy of Police on 5 April 1780. He was tried and dismissed for corruption in 1790. Subsequently, the designation was changed to "Deputy of Police and High Constable".

In 1793, Act XXXIII, Geo. III was promulgated. The post of Deputy of Police was abolished and a post of Superintendent of Police was created in its place, with a Deputy of Superintendent of Police assisting him. Mr. Simon Halliday was the first Superintendent of Police, and governed till 1808. During this time, a thorough revision and re-arrangement of policing in the area outside the Fort was carried out. The troublesome area known as "Dungree and the Woods" was split up into 14 Police divisions, each division being staffed by two English constables and a varying number of Peons (not exceeding 130 for the whole area), who were to be stationary in their respective charges and responsible for dealing with all illegal acts committed within their limits.

Post-1857 

Following the establishment of Crown rule in India after the Indian Rebellion of 1857, in 1864 Commissioners of Police were assigned to the three presidency towns of Bombay, Calcutta and Madras. On 14 December 1864, Sir Frank Souter was appointed as the first Police Commissioner of Bombay; in the same year, Khan Bahadur Sheikh Ibrahim Sheikh Imam became the first Indian to be appointed to a senior rank in the Bombay Police, while Souter remained in office for 24 years until 3 July 1888. In 1896, the Police Commissioner of Bombay's office was moved to an Indo-Saracenic building, which it still occupies to this day. The building has been designated as a protected heritage site by the Indian government.

After 1947 
After independence, many changes to the Bombay Police were instituted. On 15 August 1947, J.S. Bharucha became the first Indian head of the Bombay Police, taking over from the last British Commissioner, Mr. A.E. Caffin. A dog squad was set up in 1965. Computers were first used by the Bombay police in 1976. A Narcotics Cell and an anti-terrorist special operations squad were created in 1989.

The service was renamed to Mumbai Police in 1995, following the renaming of Bombay to Mumbai. In 1995, the control room was computerised, and finally, in 1997, the Mumbai Police went online.

Modernisation and present day 
A massive modernization of the Mumbai Police took place in 2005. New vehicles, guns and electronic equipment were procured for police use. The Tourist Squad was also created to patrol the beaches of Mumbai. On 30 May 2009 the Maharashtra government in Mumbai set up a police station dedicated to tackling cyber crime. It is the third such facility in India after Bangalore and Hyderabad. The dedicated police station will now register first information reports (FIRs) on its own and investigate offences pertaining to cyberspace. It is not clear how people abroad may report to Mumbai Cybercell. The police station will take care of all cyber cases in the city including that of terror e-mails.
The existing Cyber Crime Investigation Cell of the city police probes cyber offences, but the FIRs are registered in local police stations depending on the site of the offence.
A specially trained team of over 25 policemen, headed by an Assistant Commissioner of Police (ACP), were selected for the new job.
The facility will function under the supervision of Deputy Commissioner of Police (Preventive) and Joint Commissioner of Police (Crime).

Headquarters

The Mumbai Police Headquarters are in a Grade II-A listed heritage building that was built in 1894 and designed by John Adams, who also designed the Royal Bombay Yacht Club. It is located opposite Crawford Market in South Mumbai, a mile away from the Victoria Terminus. The construction work started on 17 November 1894 and finished two years later on 24 December 1896.  The building was formally opened on 1 January 1897.

The architectural style of the building is Gothic Revival. In contrast to the Maharashtra Police Headquarters in Fort, which uses blue basalt and was built some two decades earlier, this building uses yellow basalt. The building underwent a major restoration in 2017 for the first time in its 120-year history. In 2018, it was announced that a police museum funded by Tata Trusts would open in the building. Since then, there have been no further developments.

Organisation 
The Mumbai Police Department is headed by a Police Commissioner, who is an IPS officer. The Mumbai Police comes under the state home department through Maharashtra Police. The city is divided into Twelve police zones and Twenty Five traffic police zones, each headed by a Deputy  Commissioner of Police. The Traffic Police is a semi-autonomous body under the  Mumbai Police.

The department holds several programs for the welfare of its officials including Retirement Planning Workshop.

Geographical division 
Mumbai police is broadly divided into five regions namely Central, North, South, East and West. For administrative purposes, each region is subdivided into 3 to 4 zones. Each zone contains 3 to 4 police stations. Each zone is commanded by a Deputy Commissioner of Police (DCP). Apart from the 12 zones, there is also an additional Port zone. Police stations under the Port zone keep vigil on the Mumbai Port and container terminals in Mumbai. There are a total of 91 police stations in the jurisdiction of Mumbai Police. Every police station has a Police Inspector who is the in-charge officer of the station.

Subunits 

Mumbai Police is divided into the following units:
 Local Police
 Special Unit Service 
 Crime Branch
  or Cyber Cell  is a wing of Mumbai Police, India, to deal with computer crimes, and to enforce provisions of India's Information Technology Law, namely, The Information Technology Act, 2000, and various cyber crime related provisions of criminal laws, including the Indian Penal Code, and the Companies Act of India subsection on IT-Sector responsibilities of corporate measures to protect cybersecurity. Cyber Crime Investigation Cell is a part of Crime Branch, Criminal Investigation Department of the Mumbai Police.
 Commando Force
 Detection Unit (Mumbai Encounter Squad)
 Anti Terrorist Squad
 Traffic Police
 Administration
 Social Service Cell
 Narcotics Cell
 Wireless Cell
 Local Armed Police
 Anti-Extortion Cell
 Modus Operandi Bureau
 Missing Persons Bureau
 Special Branch
 Intelligence Unit
 Protection & Security
 Riot Control Police
 Economic Offenses Wing
 Juvenile AID Protection Unit
 Quick Response Team
 Force One

Each of these units have a Chief of the rank of Joint Commissioner of Police.

Insignia of Mumbai Police (City Police)
Gazetted Officers

Non-gazetted officers

Hierarchy

Recruitment 
Those who join the police department through the subordinate   services examination of the Maharashtra Public Service Commission enter the force at the lowest ranks of the force. Their starting rank is that of a Police constable. Those who join the police force through the combined competitive examination of the Maharashtra Public Service Commission holds a starting rank of Sub Inspector or Deputy Superintendent of Police of Maharashtra Police Service . Civil Servants who join the police force through the civil service examination conducted by UPSC  holds a starting rank of Assistant Superintendent of Police of Indian Police Service cadre. Generally the IPS officers make it to the highest rank of Director General. The Commissioner of Police of Mumbai, an IPS officer is one of the rank of Additional Director General of Police.

High-profile cases

26 November 2008 Mumbai attacks 

Anti-Terrorism Squad Chief Hemant Karkare, Additional Commissioner of Police Ashok Kamte and Encounter specialist Vijay Salaskar were among the policemen who fell to the bullets of the terrorists. Then Joint Commissioner of Mumbai Crime Branch Mr. Rakesh Maria under the leadership of Police Commissioner Hasan Gafoor tackled the abrupt attack by his superb skills. Mr. Ramesh Mahale, then an officer with crime branch investigated the case and brought the lone arrested militant Ajmal Kasab to justice. Police Commissioner Hasan Gafoor was shunted out of his office. Mahale resigned recently over a murder case investigation which he was leading.
In the following year, as a response to these attacks, a specialised counter-terrorism unit, Force One was formed and commissioned on 24 November 2009, two days before the anniversary of the 26/11 terror attacks. A Committee was appointed to look into the failures of cops pertaining to the terror attack. The Ram Pradhan Committee, as it came to be known, furnished a report recommending a series of improvements & reforms. The State Government of Maharashtra however never had this report tabled in the legislature fearing a fallout over strictures passed in the report. A Public Interest Litigation has been filed by social activist Ketan Tirodkar to demand equal justice for all the police who were killed in the terror attack; especially for the members of the Bomb Disposal Squad of Mumbai Police. During the hearing of the petition, the Government informed the High Court that the Federal Government of India has rejected the proposal to award the Bomb Disposal Squad of the city police for their contribution in defusing granades in the terror attack.

Sheena Bora murder case

Sheena Bora, an executive working for Metro One based in Mumbai, went missing on 24 April 2012. In August 2015, the Mumbai Police had received a tip-off  from an unknown man claiming that Sheena Bora had been murdered. After they got in touch with their  Counterparts in Pune, they arrested her mother, Indrani Mukerjea, her stepfather Sanjeev Khanna, and her mother's chauffeur, Shyamvar Pinturam Rai, for allegedly abducting and killing her and subsequently burning her corpse. They also arrested Indrani's husband, Peter Mukerjea in connection with the case. Rai has now been allowed to turn approver in the case after he was pardoned by the Bandra Magistrate Court in Mumbai. As of May 2017, Indrani, Peter, and Sanjeev have been lodged in Byculla Women's Prison and Arthur Road Jail in Mumbai, respectively.

Equipment 
Much of the equipment for the Mumbai Police are manufactured indigenously by the Indian Ordnance Factories controlled by the Ordnance Factories Board, Ministry of Defence, Government of India. Weapons such as Glock Pistols are imported from Austria. These pistols were first imported for the Anti-terrorist Squad in Mumbai when the same was formed in 2004.

Weapons

Rifles SMLE Mk III*, Ishapore 2A1, SUB Machine GUN CARBINE 9 mm 1A1, 7.62 MM 1A1, Assault Rifle 7.62 mm, 38 MM  Multi Shot Riot Gun, INSAS 5.56 mm, AK-47(247 in total), FN-FAL

250 MP5 German automatic sub-machine guns have just been ordered., M4, M107 anti-material rifle and SWAT equipment.

Pistols Glock pistol, Pistol Auto 9mm 1A, Smith & Wesson M&P.

Detail List of Mumbai police's Vehicles

72 speed boats have been also ordered.

Uniform

Peaked caps are worn with an orange band and crown that is less stiff such it drops downwards. Khaki short sleeve shirt and long pants are worn by most members. Some women might wear sarees if they prefer. The patch of the police force is visible too.

Mumbai police in popular culture 
Because Bollywood, India's Hindi language film industry, is primarily based in Mumbai, the Mumbai police has been frequently portrayed in films. Some of the prominent ones are listed below:

 Company (2002)
 Dum (2003)
 Aan: Men at Work (2004)
 Ab Tak Chhappan (2004)
 Black Friday (2004)
 Khakee (2004)
 Shootout at Lokhandwala (2007)
 A Wednesday (2008)
 Mumbai Meri Jaan (2008)
Slumdog Millionaire (2008)
 Department (2012)
 Talaash (2012)
 Shootout at Wadala (2013)
 The Attacks of 26/11 (2013)
 Singham Returns (2014)
 Ab Tak Chhappan 2 (2015)
 Simmba (2018)Darbar (2020)
Mumbai Saga (2021)
Sooryavanshi (2021)
Most of these films are based on the operational groups most commonly known as Encounter Squads. Officers like Pradeep Sharma, Vijay Salaskar, Praful Bhosale, Ravindra Angre etc. have previously headed these squads. Junior officers Hemant Desai, Ashok Khot, Sachin Waze, Daya Nayak, Uttam Bhosale etc. assisted them.

 Honours 
The Ashok Chakra, India's highest civilian honour during peace time, was conferred posthumously upon two Mumbai Police officers – Hemant Karkare and Ashok Kamte who laid their lives in the service of the nation during the 2008 Mumbai attacks. Junior officer Vijay Salaskar was also posthumously awarded the Ashok Chakra.

 Notable achievements 
The Cyber Crime App launched by Mumbai Police in 2019 registered 140,000 incidents within one year whereby 132,000 suspicious phone numbers were tracked.

 Controversies 
The 2008 terrorist attacks in Mumbai have been ascribed to massive intelligence failure by Mumbai Police. Indian poet Dr Tapan Kumar Pradhan in his books and social media posts has exposed several loopholes in criminal investigation by Mumbai Police, especially with regard to Hemangi Sharma Fraud Case

In 2003-04 Telgi scam also known as fake-stamp scam broke out in which Mumbai's police commissioner R.S. Sharma came to be arrested along with many other senior officers. 
Another former police commissioner of Mumbai police Sanjay Pande came to be arrested in stock-exchange scam involving tapping of telephone lines of investors. 
Encounter specialist Pradeep Sharma came to be arrested in Antilia bomb scare case involving murder of Mansukh Hiren. 

Another encounter specialist Daya Nayak absconded while anti-corruption bureau of Mumbai was seeking his custody. 

A reply filed by Director General of Police Housing Corporation (former Police Commissioner of Mumbai) Arup Patnaik has exposed land-grabbing offence by IASs, IPSs & Bombay High Court Judges wherein six prime plots
of land reserved for service quarters of constabulary were usurped by private housing societies of the land-grabbing bureaucrats and judges of Bombay High Court. Three plots of land are located at Worli Sea Face while three are Western-Mumbai suburb Andheri west. This disclosure exposing the biggest organised land-grab operation by bureaucrats & judges was made by Director General of Police Housing Corporation Shri Arupji Patnaiksaheb in his reply to  a Public Interest Litigation filed by former journalist Ketan Tirodkar.   

 See also 

 Mumbai
 History of Mumbai
 Mumbai Fire Brigade
 Maharashtra Police

Literature
 Kadam, B. S. Sri; Socio-Historical Study Of Police Administration in Bombay Presidency (1861 to 1947); Kolhapur 1993 (Diss. Shivaji University)
 Kennedy, M. Notes On Criminal Classes in the Bombay Presidency Appendices regarding some Foreign Criminals who occasionally visit the Presidency: Including Hints on the Detection of Counterfeit Coin; Bombay 1908
 Edwardes, Stephen M. (Commissioner of Police); The Bombay City Police: A Historical Sketch, 1672–1916;  Bombay u.a. 1923
 Edwardes, Stephen M.; Crime in India:  Brief Review of the more Important Offences included in the Annual Criminal Returns with Chapters on Prostitution & Miscellaneous Matters; Oxford u.a. 1924
 Statistiken: gedruckt im: Annual Report of Police for the Town and Island of Bombay,'' laufende Monatsstatistiken auf Mumbai Police

Notes

References

External links

 Official website of the Mumbai Police
 Mumbai Traffic Police, Official website

 
Maharashtra Police
Organisations based in Mumbai
1864 establishments in British India

de:Bombay City Police#Mumbai Police